Finvasia is an Indian fintech company headquartered in Mohali, Punjab. The organization has expanded its hands into healthcare services by acquiring Ginihealth and into retail FX space by acquiring major investment platform Zulu Trade where the existing CEO of Finvasia Tajinder Virk became Zulu's interim chief.

History 
Ex Wall Street banker Tajinder Pal Singh and brother Sarvjeet Singh started Finvasia in Canada in 2009 and ventured into India after registering with Securities and Exchange Board of India (SEBI) as Foreign Institutional Investor (FII, now FPI).

In 2013, the company entered the retail brokerage market after receiving regulatory approvals from NSE and MCX.

In 2015, Finvasia became a trading Member of Bombay Stock Exchange Ltd (BSE) and The Association of Mutual Funds in India (AMFI).

In 2016, Finvasia received foreign direct investment (FDI) funding against a valuation of ₹150 crore from Mauritius based Intrinsic Investment Limited. In the same year it was named among the 20 Most Promising Banking Solution Companies by Silicon India.

In 2017, the company received the license to operate as a non-banking financial corporation (NBFC) from RBI.

In 2018, the company became member of National Commodity & Derivatives Exchange Limited (NCDEX) & received SEBI registration to allow its clients to trade on NSE, BSE, MCX & NCDEX from a single trading account. 

In June 2021, Finvasia group acquired a 100% stake in Fxview  - a financial services company based in Cyprus. Finvasia acquired fintech company ActTrader Technologies in 2021. ActTrader was formerly known as Act Forex. In 2023, Finvasia got the Investment Banking Licence from the Financial Services Commission of Mauritius (FSC).

Awards 
2017: Awarded Best Trading Execution or Brokerage Platform at the 2017 Benzinga Global Fintech Awards in New York, USA.

References 

Financial services companies established in 2009
Indian companies established in 2009
Online brokerages
Brokerage firms
Financial services companies of India
2009 establishments in Punjab, India